Zavodskoy is the name of several rural localities in Russia.

Modern inhabited localities

Urban localities
Zavodskoy, Republic of North Ossetia-Alania, an urban-type settlement under the administrative jurisdiction of Promyshlenny City District of Vladikavkaz City Under Republic Jurisdiction in the Republic of North Ossetia–Alania

Rural localities
Zavodskoy, Altai Krai, a settlement in Zavodskoy Selsoviet of Tyumentsevsky District of Altai Krai
Zavodskoy, Irkutsk Oblast, a settlement in Chunsky District of Irkutsk Oblast
Zavodskoy, Kirov Oblast, a settlement under the administrative jurisdiction of the urban-type settlement of Leninskoye of Shabalinsky District of Kirov Oblast
Zavodskoy, Vsevolozhsky District, Leningrad Oblast, a logging depot settlement in Kuyvozovskoye Settlement Municipal Formation of Vsevolozhsky District of Leningrad Oblast
Zavodskoy, Vyborgsky District, Leningrad Oblast, a logging depot settlement in Krasnoselskoye Settlement Municipal Formation of Vyborgsky District of Leningrad Oblast
Zavodskoy, Lipetsk Oblast, a settlement in Dobrovsky Selsoviet of Dobrovsky District of Lipetsk Oblast
Zavodskoy, Mari El Republic, a settlement under the administrative jurisdiction of the urban-type settlement of Mari-Turek of Mari-Tureksky District of the Mari El Republic
Zavodskoy, Bessonovsky District, Penza Oblast, a settlement in Prokazninsky Selsoviet of Bessonovsky District of Penza Oblast
Zavodskoy, Mokshansky District, Penza Oblast, a settlement in Chernozersky Selsoviet of Mokshansky District of Penza Oblast
Zavodskoy, Zemetchinsky District, Penza Oblast, a settlement in Saltykovsky Selsoviet of Zemetchinsky District of Penza Oblast
Zavodskoy, Tambov Oblast, a settlement in Novospassky Selsoviet of Pervomaysky District of Tambov Oblast
Zavodskoy, Tomsk Oblast, a settlement in Parabelsky District of Tomsk Oblast
Zavodskoy, Tver Oblast, a settlement in Kimrsky District of Tver Oblast
Zavodskoy, Ulyanovsk Oblast, a settlement in Yedelevsky Rural Okrug of Kuzovatovsky District of Ulyanovsk Oblast
Zavodskoy, Voronezh Oblast, a settlement in Semeno-Alexandrovskoye Rural Settlement of Bobrovsky District of Voronezh Oblast
Zavodskoy, Yaroslavl Oblast, a settlement in Lyubilkovsky Rural Okrug of Rostovsky District of Yaroslavl Oblast

Abolished inhabited localities
Zavodskoy, Primorsky Krai, a former urban-type settlement in Primorsky Krai; since 2004—a part of the town of Artyom
Zavodskoy, Rostov Oblast, a former urban-type settlement in Rostov Oblast; since 2005—a part of the town of Kamensk-Shakhtinsky

References